The 2022 San Luis Open Challenger was a professional tennis tournament played on clay courts. It was the 27th edition of the tournament which was part of the 2022 ATP Challenger Tour. It took place in San Luis Potosí, Mexico between 11 and 17 April 2022.

Singles main-draw entrants

Seeds

 1 Rankings are as of 4 April 2022.

Other entrants
The following players received wildcards into the singles main draw:
  Alex Hernández
  Shintaro Mochizuki
  Rodrigo Pacheco Méndez

The following players received entry into the singles main draw as alternates:
  Viktor Durasovic
  Peđa Krstin

The following players received entry from the qualifying draw:
  Antoine Bellier
  Hady Habib
  Gilbert Klier Júnior
  Roberto Quiroz
  Shang Juncheng
  Matías Zukas

Champions

Singles

  Antoine Bellier def.  Renzo Olivo 6–7(2–7), 6–4, 7–5.

Doubles

 Nicolás Barrientos /  Miguel Ángel Reyes-Varela def.  Luis David Martínez /  Felipe Meligeni Alves 7–6(13–11), 6–2.

References

2022 ATP Challenger Tour
2022
2022 in Mexican tennis
April 2022 sports events in Mexico